Charles James Correll (February 2, 1890 – September 26, 1972) was an American radio comedian, actor and writer, known best for his work in the radio series Amos 'n' Andy with Freeman Gosden. Correll voiced the main character Andy Brown, along with various lesser characters.

Biography

Career 
Correll was born in Peoria, Illinois. He worked originally as a stenographer and a bricklayer. He met Gosden in Durham, North Carolina while working for the Joe Bren Producing Company. Both Correll and Freeman vacationed at Lake Geneva, Wisconsin during the 1930s and would broadcast Amos 'n' Andy from there. From 1928 to 1934, the team never had a vacation away from their radio show.  To celebrate the 30th anniversary of Amos 'n' Andy, the broadcast of March 19, 1958, was done by Correll and Gosden using their real voices and calling each other by their real names; this had never been done for the program before.

During 1961–1962, Gosden and Correll provided the voices for the animated series Calvin and the Colonel for American Broadcasting Company-TV.

Last years 
Correll died in 1972 in a Chicago hospital after a heart attack. At the time of his death he was retired and living in Beverly Hills, California, just a few blocks away from his radio partner, Freeman Gosden.

Personal life and family 
Correll's first marriage to Marie Janes ended with divorce on May 26, 1937; the couple had been married for ten years and did not have any children.  On September 11, 1937, in Glendale, California, he married Alyce McLaughlin, a former dancer; they had six children, Dorothy, Charles, Barbara, John, and Richard. On July 5, 1954, John Correll, his seven-year-old son, died of what seemed to be an accidental poisoning. An autopsy determined the young boy died of an acute kidney infection. A baby girl born to the couple in 1939 died when she was less than a day old.

His son, Charles Correll, Jr. became an actor and a director. Another son, Richard Correll also became an actor—remembered best as the character Richard Rickover of Leave It to Beaver—and also produced and directed the television situation comedy Family Matters.

Correll was a Freemason.

Political views
Correll supported Barry Goldwater in the 1964 United States presidential election.

Legacy 
The comedy team was named to the Radio Hall of Fame in 1962. In 1969, Correll was memorialized with a star on the Hollywood Walk of Fame for his radio work. In 1977, Correll was inducted in the National Association of Broadcasters Hall of Fame along with Gosden.

References

External links

 

1890 births
1972 deaths
20th-century American comedians
20th-century American male actors
20th-century American singers
Actors from Peoria, Illinois
American bricklayers
American Freemasons
American male comedians
American male radio actors
American male voice actors
Blackface minstrel performers
Burials at Holy Cross Cemetery, Culver City
Comedians from Illinois